William Hall (AOPV 433). will be the fourth  for the Royal Canadian Navy. The class was derived from the Arctic Offshore Patrol Ship project as part of the National Shipbuilding Procurement Strategy and is primarily designed for the patrol and support of Canada's Arctic regions. Named after Quartermaster William Nelson Edward Hall, who was the first African Canadian to receive the Victoria Cross. He received the medal for his actions in the 1857 Siege of Lucknow during the Indian Rebellion.

The keel for William Hall was laid on 17 February 2021 and the hull floated-out on 27 November 2022.

Design and construction 
The s are designed for use in the Arctic regions of Canada for patrol and support within Canada's exclusive economic zone. The ship has an enclosed foredeck that protects machinery and work spaces from Arctic climates. The vessel will be powered by a diesel-electric system composed of four  MAN 6L32/44CR four-stroke medium-speed diesel generators and two electric propulsion motors rated at  driving two shafts. The ship will also be equipped with a bow thruster to aid during manoeuvres and docking procedures without requiring tugboat assistance. William Hall will be equipped with fin stabilizers to decrease roll in open water but can be retracted during icebreaking.

William Hall will be able to deploy with multiple payloads, including shipping containers, underwater survey equipment or landing craft. Payload operations are aided by a  crane for loading and unloading. The ship is equipped with a vehicle bay which can hold pickup trucks, all-terrain vehicles and snowmobiles. The ship will be armed with one BAE Mk 38  gun and two M2 Browning machine guns. The patrol ship has an onboard hangar and flight deck for helicopters up to the size of a Sikorsky CH-148 Cyclone. William Hall will have a complement of 65 and accommodation for 85 or 87.

References

Harry DeWolf-class offshore patrol vessels
Canadian defence procurement